Paulo Scanlan (also known as Paul Scanlan) (born 9 August 1996) is a Samoan footballer and rugby union player who has played for the Samoa national football team and Samoa national rugby sevens team.

Scanlan played football as a midfielder for Vaipuna in the Samoa National League. He made his debut for the national team at the 2016 OFC Nations Cup on May 29, 2016 in their 4–0 loss against Tahiti. In 2019 he played for Vailima Kiwi FC in the 2019 OFC Champions League. In December 2019 he announced he was leaving football to pursue a career in rugby.

In April 2019 he was selected for the Samoa national rugby sevens team to play in the Hong Kong sevens. He subsequently played in Dubai. In June 2021 he was selected for the 2020 Men's Rugby Sevens Final Olympic Qualification Tournament. In December 2021 he was part of the team for the World Sevens Series. In July 2022 he was named to the team to represent Samoa at the 2022 Commonwealth Games. He later competed at the Rugby World Cup Sevens in Cape Town.

References

External links
 

Living people
1996 births
Samoan footballers
Kiwi FC players
Samoa international footballers
2016 OFC Nations Cup players
Association football midfielders
Samoa youth international footballers
Samoa international rugby sevens players
Rugby sevens players at the 2022 Commonwealth Games